Eys is a village in the municipality of Gulpen-Wittem, Limburg, the Netherlands. The town is located 3 km. from Gulpen and 17 km. from provincial capital Maastricht. Furthermore, it is characterised by its location in the hilly landscape of South Limburg. The village was first mentioned in 1193 in a document of the Sint-Pauluskapittel of Liège, Belgium, and was named after the river Eyserbeek.

The Eyserbosweg (the road ('weg') that leads from the village to the forest ('bos')) is one of the hills to be climbed in the yearly professional cycle race Amstel Gold Race, first held in 1966. The organiser is not sure when the Eyserbosweg was first involved in the race.

It was also the hill that featured in the Open Dutch Championship Bag Carrying ('zakkendragen'), a race against the clock in which people had to carry a bag with sand up the one kilometer long hill. The weight of the bag was 25 kg (women), 50 kg, 75 kg or 100 kg (men). That championship had its roots in a bet made by a farmer who claimed in 1956 that his farm help would be able to carry a 100 kg bag to the top.

Gallery

References 

Populated places in Limburg (Netherlands)
Gulpen-Wittem